Ustroń  is a health resort town in Cieszyn Silesia, southern Poland. It is situated in the Silesian Voivodeship (since 1999), having previously been in Bielsko-Biała Voivodeship (1975–1998). It lies in the Silesian Beskids mountain range.

It is the home of the Jan Jarocki Museum, which was founded in April 1986 as Museum of Metallurgy. It is housed in an old building of the former Klemens Steel Works, which was in use between 1772 and 1897. The museum collects technical tools, as well as historical and ethnographic artifacts.

The Równica and Czantoria mountains are nearby and hikable from the town center.

History
The settlement was first mentioned in a Latin document of Diocese of Wrocław called Liber fundationis episcopatus Vratislaviensis from around 1305 as item in Ustrona. It meant that the village was in the process of location (the size of land to pay a tithe from was not yet precise). The creation of the village was a part of a larger settlement campaign taking place in the late 13th century on the territory of what would later be known as Upper Silesia.

Politically, the village belonged initially to the Duchy of Teschen, formed in 1290 in the process of feudal fragmentation of Poland, and was ruled by a local branch of Piast dynasty. In 1327, the duchy became a fee of Kingdom of Bohemia, which, after 1526, became part of the Habsburg monarchy.

The village became a seat of a Catholic parish, mentioned in the register of Peter's Pence payment from 1447 among the 50 parishes of Teschen deanery as Wstrowe.

In 1772, the Klemens Steel Works was opened and the village was gradually industrialised. When the steel work was closed in 1897 the market town switched to be more orientated towards a health and spa resort.

After the Revolutions of 1848 in the Austrian Empire, a modern municipal division was introduced in the re-established Austrian Silesia. Ustroń as a municipality was subscribed to the political district of Bielsko and the legal district of Skoczów. In 1856, it gained market town rights. According to the censuses conducted in 1880, 1890, 1900 and 1910 the population of the municipality dropped from 4375 in 1880 to 4275 in 1910, with a majority being native Polish-speakers (91.5–92.8%), a growing minority speaking German (from 267 or 6.2% in 1880 to 333 or 7.8% in 1910), and dwindling Czech-speaking population (99 or 2.3% in 1880 to 15 or 0.4% in 1910). In terms of religion, the majority were Protestants (57.1% in 1910), followed by Roman Catholics (40.4% in 1910) and Jews (107 or 2.5% in 1910). Ustroń was also traditionally inhabited by Cieszyn Vlachs, speaking Cieszyn Silesian dialect.

After World War I, the fall of Austria-Hungary, the Polish–Czechoslovak War and the division of Cieszyn Silesia in 1920, it became a part of Poland. It was then annexed by Nazi Germany at the beginning of World War II. After the war it was restored to Poland.

It gained city rights in 1956. Since the 1960s it saw a large development of new hotels and health centers. A cluster of pyramid-shaped hotels were built in the town. It was also expanded by merger of the surrounding villages: Nierodzim in 1974, Hermanice and Lipowiec in 1975.

Sport
 Kuźnia Ustroń – football club founded in 1922
 TRS Siła Ustroń – volleyball club

Education
 The Alfred Meissner Graduated School of Dental Engineering and the Humanities

Notable people
Karol Hławiczka (1894-1976), composer and educator
Theodor Kotschy (1813–1866), Austrian botanist
Jan Szwarc (born 1946), politician

Twin towns – sister cities

Ustroń is twinned with:

 Frenštát pod Radhoštěm, Czech Republic
 Hajdúnánás, Hungary
 Kalety, Poland
 Luhačovice, Czech Republic
 Neukirchen-Vluyn, Germany
 Piešťany, Slovakia
 Újbuda (Budapest), Hungary
 Ustronie Morskie, Poland

Gallery

References

Bibliography

External links

 Official web site of Ustroń
 Jewish Community in Ustroń on Virtual Shtetl

 
Spa towns in Poland